Bakhtiyar Gulamov (10 July 1949 – 7 January 2014) was an Azerbaijani footballer who primarily played as a midfielder.

Bakhtiyar Gulamov died on 7 January 2014, aged 64, in his hometown of Baku, Azerbaijan.

References

1949 births
2014 deaths
Footballers from Baku
Azerbaijani footballers
Association football midfielders